Gano Forum, literally People's Forum, is a political party in Bangladesh. GF was formed through a split of the Awami League and the merger of civil society groups in 1992. The party is headed by one of its founders, the constitutional lawyer and international jurist Dr. Kamal Hossain.

The former Bangladeshi finance minister Abul Maal Abdul Muhith served as the founding general secretary of party. After the death of Saifuddin Ahmed Manik in 2008, Then Mostafa Mohsin Montu served almost one decade and then Dr Reza Kibria has served as the General Secretary until he resign from the party on February, 2021 

Veteran politicians such as Advocate Zahirul Islam (former member of Parliament) and Mr. Mafizul Islam Khan Kamal (former member of Parliament) are a part of Gano Forum. Mr. Mafizul Islam Khan Kamal is the executive president of the party. Amsaa Amin, Abu Sayeed, A. H. M. Khalequzzaman, Shubrata Chowdhury, Mostafa Mohsin Montu, Sultan Md. Monsur Ahmed, Reza Kibria were the candidates of Gano Forum from Jatiya Oikya Front in the 2018 Bangladeshi general election

References

 
1992 establishments in Bangladesh
Political parties established in 1992
Political parties in Bangladesh